Bernard Marmaduke Fitzalan-Howard, 16th Duke of Norfolk  (30 May 1908 – 31 January 1975), styled Earl of Arundel and Surrey until 1917, was a British peer and politician. He was the eldest surviving son of Henry Fitzalan-Howard, 15th Duke of Norfolk, who died when Bernard was only nine years old. His mother was Gwendoline Herries, 12th Lady Herries of Terregles, and he inherited her peerage when she died in 1945.

He was educated at the Oratory School and was commissioned into the Royal Horse Guards in 1931, but resigned his commission in 1933. He joined the 4th Battalion, Royal Sussex Regiment, in the Territorial Army in 1934, and was promoted Major in 1939. He served briefly in the Battle of France, during which he was evacuated sick. He subsequently served as Agricultural Secretary in Winston Churchill's Cabinet from February 1941 until June 1945. 

As hereditary Earl Marshal, he organised the coronation of King George VI and Queen Elizabeth, the coronation of Queen Elizabeth II, the funeral of Winston Churchill, and the investiture of Prince Charles as Prince of Wales. He was a keen cricket fan and was the manager of the English cricket team in Australia in 1962–63, which excited much press interest.

Personal life
The duke married the Hon Lavinia Mary Strutt, daughter of Algernon Strutt, 3rd Baron Belper, and his wife Eva, on 27 January 1937 at the Brompton Oratory. They had four daughters, three granddaughters and two great-grandchildren:
 Lady Anne Elizabeth Fitzalan-Howard, 14th Lady Herries of Terregles, Baroness Cowdrey of Tonbridge (12 June 1938 – 23 November 2014); she married Colin Cowdrey, Baron Cowdrey of Tonbridge, in 1985.
 Lady Mary Katharine Fitzalan-Howard, 15th Lady Herries of Terregles, DCVO (14 August 1940 – 7 April 2017); she married G/Capt. Anthony Mumford in 1986.
 Lady Sarah Margaret Fitzalan-Howard (23 September 1941 – 14 June 2015); she married Nigel Clutton on 25 March 1988
 Lady Theresa Jane Fitzalan-Howard, Marchioness of Lothian, 16th Lady Herries of Terregles (24 June 1945); she married Michael Andrew Foster Jude Kerr, 13th Marquess of Lothian, on 7 June 1975. They have three daughters and two grandchildren.

The 16th duke died on 31 January 1975, and is buried in the  Fitzalan Chapel in the western grounds of Arundel Castle in Sussex.

Cricket

The announcement that the Duke would manage the MCC cricket team in Australia in 1962–63 came as a complete surprise. He was a keen cricketer, who was President of the MCC in 1956–57 and was still a member of its powerful committee. He had managed his own tour of the West Indies with a Duke of Norfolk's XI in 1956–67, which had included the England players Tom Graveney, John Warr, Doug Wright and Willie Watson, and would organise another in 1969–70.

His father, the 15th Duke, had built the picturesque Arundel Castle Cricket Ground and the Duke hosted matches against touring teams there from 1954, a tradition continued by his widow, Lavinia. He was not a good cricketer, even at village green level, and it was customary to let him get off the mark before he returned to the pavilion. At Arundel the umpire was his own butler, who when he was out would diplomatically announce "His Grace is not in". The Duke was chosen after a chance remark while having drinks after an MCC Committee meeting. Billy Griffith was the prime candidate to manage the tour, but he had just been appointed the Secretary of the MCC and needed to remain at Lord's to oversee the change from the old divisions between amateurs and professionals that had been decided that autumn. The Duke offered his services when it was mentioned that the new captain Ted Dexter would be difficult to control.

Like Dexter, the Duke was a keen follower of horse-racing, and, as President of Sussex County Cricket Club, he was often at Hove and Arundel and had appointed Dexter county captain. When his appointment was announced it was joked that only a duke could manage "Lord Ted". In those days the MCC tour was seen as a social event and the team were scheduled to attend many high society events for which the Duke was well suited. His relationship with Fred Trueman was mixed; he first spoke to him at the Second Test by calling "Trueman! Over here!" and beckoning him with his finger, to which the fast bowler took exception, but they later became good friends. Socially, the Duke was a great success, his transparent enjoyment of the game and affability with the players, press and public making him popular.

As Earl Marshal of England, while in Australia he prepared the Queen's 1963 Royal Visit. He had to return to Great Britain for reasons of state for a month during the tour, which allowed Griffith to fly out and take over in his absence, thus gaining useful experience of touring Australia.

Dukedom of Norfolk and Earl Marshal

As Duke of Norfolk, he was Earl Marshal and Hereditary Marshal of England. In that capacity, the Duke had helped to organise various state ceremonies such as the coronation of King George VI in 1937 and that of Queen Elizabeth II in 1953. He also helped to organise the state funerals of King George VI in 1952 and of Winston Churchill in 1965. In 1969, he also took part in the planning for the investiture of Prince Charles as the Prince of Wales.

On his death, the dukedom passed to his second cousin once removed Miles Stapleton-Fitzalan-Howard, 12th Baron Beaumont, 4th Baron Howard of Glossop. The Lordship of Herries of Terregles, being an old Scottish peerage, was inherited by his eldest daughter, Anne (14th Lady Herries of Terregles, Baroness Cowdrey of Tonbridge), who had married English cricketer Colin Cowdrey.

Family tree

Titles and honours

Titles
Earl of Arundel (1908–1917)
His Grace The Duke of Norfolk (1917–1975)

Honours
Knight of The Most Noble Order of The Garter (1937)
Knight Grand Cross of the Royal Victorian Order (1946)
Knight Grand Cross of the Order of the British Empire (1968)
Territorial Decoration (1969)
Privy Council of the United Kingdom (1936)
Lord Lieutenant of Sussex (1949–1974)
Deputy Lieutenant of Sussex (1945)
Lord Lieutenant of West Sussex (1974–1975)

See also
Re Duke of Norfolk's Settlement Trusts [1982] Ch 61, a case concerning the payment of the trustees of the 16th Duke's family trust

References

1908 births
1975 deaths
24
British Army personnel of World War II
316
Earls Marshal
34
123
306
English Roman Catholics
Bernard Fitzalan-Howard, 16th Duke of Norfolk
Knights Grand Cross of the Order of the British Empire
Knights Grand Cross of the Royal Victorian Order
Knights of the Garter
Lord-Lieutenants of Sussex
Lord-Lieutenants of West Sussex
Lords Herries of Terregles
Members of the Privy Council of the United Kingdom
Ministers in the Churchill caretaker government, 1945
Ministers in the Churchill wartime government, 1940–1945
People educated at The Oratory School
Presidents of the Marylebone Cricket Club
Royal Horse Guards officers
Royal Sussex Regiment officers
Deputy Lieutenants of Sussex